Senator Fletcher may refer to:

Allen M. Fletcher (1853–1922), Vermont State Senate
Duncan U. Fletcher (1859–1936), U.S. Senator from Florida
Ed Fletcher (1872–1955), California State Senate
George Latham Fletcher (1874–1929), Virginia State Senate
Henry A. Fletcher (1839–1897), Vermont State Senate
Thomas Fletcher (Arkansas politician) (1817–1880), Arkansas State Senate